Gushan station may refer to the follow stations:

Railway Station
 Gushan railway station (Taiwan) (鼓山站), a railway station in Kaohsiung, Taiwan
 Gushan railway station (Shanxi) (孤山站), a railway station in Datong, Shanxi, China
 Gushan railway station (Hunan) (谷山站), a railway station on Changsha–Zhuzhou–Xiangtan intercity railway in Changsha, Hunan, China

Metro Station
 Gushan station (Fuzhou Metro) (鼓山站), a metro station in Fuzhou, Fujian, China

See Also
 Gushan (disambiguation)